Diego Churín (born 1 December 1989) is an Argentine footballer who plays as striker for Paraguayan club Cerro Porteño.

Honours

Club
Universidad de Concepción
 Copa Chile (1): 2014-15

Cerro Porteño
 Paraguayan Primera División (2): C-2017, A-2020

Grêmio
Campeonato Gaúcho: 2021, 2022
Recopa Gaúcha: 2021

Individual 
Curicó Unido
 Top Goalscorer of Primera B de Chile: Transición 2013
Cerro Porteño
 Top Goalscorer of Paraguayan Primera División: 2017

External links
 
 

1989 births
Living people
Argentine footballers
Argentine expatriate footballers
Club Atlético Independiente footballers
Club Atlético Platense footballers
Club Atlético Los Andes footballers
Unión Española footballers
Curicó Unido footballers
Universidad de Concepción footballers
Cerro Porteño players
Grêmio Foot-Ball Porto Alegrense players
Atlético Clube Goianiense players
Primera B de Chile players
Chilean Primera División players
Argentine Primera División players
Paraguayan Primera División players
Campeonato Brasileiro Série A players
Expatriate footballers in Chile
Expatriate footballers in Paraguay
Association football forwards